The Parting of the Ways is an historic site in Sweetwater County, Wyoming, United States, where the Oregon and California Trails fork from the original route to Fort Bridger to an alternative route, the Sublette-Greenwood Cutoff, across the Little Colorado Desert. Many wagon trains parted company, some preferring the shorter cutoff route, which involved fifty waterless miles, to the longer but better-watered main route.

The route was not established by Sublette, but rather a mountain man named Greenwood. The error in attribution arose when Joseph E. Ware's Emigrant's Guide to California (1849) listed the alternate path as the "Sublette Cutoff."

References

External links
 photographs at the National Park Service's NRHP database
Parting of the Ways at the Wyoming State Historic Preservation Office

Transportation on the National Register of Historic Places in Wyoming
Geography of Sweetwater County, Wyoming
Oregon Trail
Road transportation on the National Register of Historic Places
National Register of Historic Places in Sweetwater County, Wyoming